Omaha Productions is an American entertainment company founded by former football quarterback Peyton Manning. It is known for producing Manningcast, an alternate live television broadcast of ESPN's Monday Night Football hosted by Peyton and Eli Manning.

History 
Omaha Productions was founded in 2020, taking his name from his trademark audible call, "Omaha, Omaha!"  In 2021, ESPN made a multiyear deal with the platform to produce ten games per NFL season until 2023. Manningcast airs on ESPN2 and ESPN+ featuring brothers Peyton and Eli Manning discussing the live game and interviewing sports guests such as Nick Saban, Tom Brady, and Charles Barkley. The platform  also produces ESPN+'s Places series.

Television series 
 Peyton's Places (2019–present)
 Abby's Places (2021)
 Eli's Places (2021–present)
 Monday Night Football with Peyton and Eli / Manningcast (2021–present)
 Rowdy's Places (2022)
 Big Papi's Places (2022)
 Vince's Places (2022)
 Sue's Places (2022)

References

External links 
 

ESPN
Sports entertainment
2020 establishments in the United States